Coogee, an electoral district of the Legislative Assembly in the Australian state of New South Wales, was created in 1927.


Members for Coogee

Election results

Elections in the 2010s

2019

2015

2011

Elections in the 2000s

2007

2003

Elections in the 1990s

1999

1995

1991

Elections in the 1980s

1988

1984

1981

Elections in the 1970s

1978

1976

1974 by-election

1973

1971

Elections in the 1960s

1968

1965

1962

Elections in the 1950s

1959

1956

1953

1950

Elections in the 1940s

1948 by-election

1947

1944

1941

Elections in the 1930s

1938 by-election

1938
This section is an excerpt from 1938 New South Wales state election § Coogee

1935
This section is an excerpt from 1935 New South Wales state election § Coogee

1932
This section is an excerpt from 1932 New South Wales state election § Coogee

1930
This section is an excerpt from 1930 New South Wales state election § Coogee

Elections in the 1920s

1928 by-election

1927
This section is an excerpt from 1927 New South Wales state election § Coogee

Notes

References

New South Wales state electoral results by district